Mo'in al-Din Junayd ibn Mahmud ibn Muhammad Baghnovi Shirazi was a Sufi mystic and poet of Persia from the 14th century.

He has two works, namely, a divan, and Shadd al-Izar (written in 1389). The latter work contains the biographies of over three hundred famous persons buried in Shiraz, Iran.

References

 E.G. Browne. Literary History of Persia. (Four volumes, 2,256 pages, and twenty-five years in the writing). 1998. 
 Jan Rypka, History of Iranian Literature. Reidel Publishing Company. ASIN B-000-6BXVT-K

See also

List of Persian poets and authors
Persian literature

Sufi poets
Iranian Sufis